Mad Oak Studios is a recording studio located in Allston, Massachusetts neighborhood of Boston, United States. It was established in the year 2000 by Craig Riggs and Frank Pagliughi, who were later joined by PK Pandey and long-time head engineer Benny Grotto as co-owners.

History
Mad Oak Studios’ original location was formerly home to a wood-working shop called Mad Oak Wood Working. Craig Riggs, then-frontman of the rock band Roadsaw, realized that much of his band's revenue was being spent on studio time, and became determined to open a recording studio catering to musicians with limited income who did not want to be forced to compromise the recording quality of their music for financial reasons.

He partnered with Frank Pagliughi, and together they took over the wood shop’s space. After adopting the woodshop's name, Mad Oak Studios was born in the year 2000.

In 2013, due to the booming residential market in Allston, Massachusetts, the studio was forced to change locations. That same year, the studio parted ways with co-owner Frank Pagliughi, and Benny Grotto was made co-owner.  Construction on a new studio began in early 2015, and was completed later that year.

Personnel
Benny Grotto (2010 Boston Music Awards' Producer Of The Year) - head engineer

Facilities
Mad Oak has a Walters-Storyk Design Group-designed control room, a variety of live room acoustic options, and multiple isolation booths.

Artists who have recorded at Mad Oak Studios

 Acaro
 Aerosmith
 Aloud
 Another Animal
 The Antlers
 Blood for Blood
 Big D and the Kids Table
 Kim Boekbinder
 The Connection
 Cortez
 Will Dailey
 Howie Day
 deadlikedeath
 Death Ray Vision
 Dixie Witch
 Tanya Donelly
 The Dresden Dolls
 The Ducky Boys
 Face of the Sun
 Ben Folds
 Marti Frederiksen
 Tony Furtado
 Neil Gaiman
 Gang Green
 Gozu
 Juliana Hatfield
 Levon Helm
 InAeona
 Joey Kramer
 Damian Kulash
 The Lights Out
 Lo-Pan
 Bryan McPherson
 Mellow Bravo
 James Montgomery
 Motherboar
 Arthur Nasson
 New Collisions
 Oddzar
 Only Living Witness
 Orange Goblin
 Amanda Palmer
 PanzerBastard
 Ramallah
 Razors in the Night
 Rebirth Brass Band
 Eli "Paperboy" Reed
 Roadsaw
 Ruby Rose Fox
 Sasquatch
 Scissorfight
 Second Grave
 Andrew Shea 
 Jules Shear
 Sinners & Saints
 Slapshot
 Slothrust
 Solace
 Stars & Stripes
 Suplecs
 Steven Tyler
 Upper Crust, The
 Victory at Sea
 Brian Viglione
 Waltham
 The Wandas
 The Welch Boys
 The World Inferno Friendship Society
 "Weird Al" Yankovic
 Thalia Zedek

Live at Mad Oak

Live at Mad Oak was a monthly concert series, featuring local talent performing in front of an invite-only audience. They were multi-tracked and captured by a professional filming crew. The shows were mixed live-to-stereo and made available online the next morning. This was supported entirely by the studio with the sole purpose of promoting local artists.

References

2000 establishments in Massachusetts
Buildings and structures in Boston
Companies based in Boston
Mass media companies established in 2000
Recording studios in the United States
American companies established in 2000